Herpetopoma larochei is a species of sea snail, a marine gastropod mollusc in the family Chilodontidae.

Distribution 
This species occurs in New Zealand.

References

larochei
Gastropods described in 1926